South Carolina elected its members February 12–13, 1823.

See also 
 1822 South Carolina's 2nd congressional district special election
 1822 South Carolina's 4th congressional district special election
 1822 South Carolina's 9th congressional district special election
 1822 and 1823 United States House of Representatives elections
 List of United States representatives from South Carolina

1822
South Carolina
United States House of Representatives